Carlos Jesús Zárate Scott (born May 23, 1988) is a Mexican former professional boxer. He is the son of former world boxing champion Carlos Zárate.

Professional career
On September 15, 2009 Zárate Jr. won his pro debut against Miguel Ángel Tejeda by knockout, on a card that also featured Saúl Álvarez.

See also
Notable boxing families

References

External links

Boxers from Mexico City
Light-welterweight boxers
1988 births
Living people
Mexican male boxers